Saša Kosović (born July 18, 1979) is a Serbian–Bosnian professional basketball coach and former player. He was an assistant coach for Crvena zvezda between 2011 and 2022.

Early life 
Kosović was born in Sarajevo, SR Bosnia and Herzegovina, SFR Yugoslavia to a Bosnian-Serb family. He started to train basketball at age 7 for his hometown team Bosna. He was born in the same year that Bosnia won the European Champions Cup. He trained there until 1992 when he had to move because of the war.

Kosović played for Mladost from Gacko and Leotar Trebinje. After two seasons playing in the First League of Republika Srpska, he decided to retire as a player. In 1999, he moved to Belgrade, Serbia to start his professional education. Kosović earned his bachelor's degree in physical education from the University of Belgrade in 2006. In 2014, he graduated from a program for a basketball coach.

Coaching career

Early career 
Kosović began his coaching career in 2002. In the first years, he worked for Belgrade-based teams; Cerak and Beoas. In 2007, he went back to Trebinje where he became an assistant coach for his former team Leotar of the Basketball Championship of Bosnia and Herzegovina. After three seasons he returns to Belgrade, Serbia. 

In the 2010–11 season, Kosović was an assistant coach for the FMP of the Basketball League of Serbia. The FMP's head coaches were Boško Đokić and Aleksandar Petrović.

In the late 2000s and early 2010s, Kosović was a coach at the Bodiroga Basketball Camp in Trebinje.

Crvena zvezda assistant (2011–2022) 
On the start of the 2011–12 season, Crvena zvezda has added Kosović to their coaching staff as an assistant coach. Since then he has been a part of coaching staffs of the Zvezda head coaches, as follows Svetislav Pešić, Milivoje Lazić, Vlada Vukoičić, Dejan Radonjić, Dušan Alimpijević, Milenko Topić, Milan Tomić, Andrija Gavrilović, Dragan Šakota, and Saša Obradović. Over eleven seasons with the Zvezda, he won 20 national and Adriatic titles.

National team coaching career 

In August 2022, Kosović was named an assistant coach for the Serbia national team under Svetislav Pešić. He was a staff member at EuroBasket 2022.

Career achievements 
As assistant coach
 Serbian League champion: 7  (with Crvena zvezda: 2014–15, 2015–16, 2016–17, 2017–18, 2018–19, 2020–21, 2021–22)
 Adriatic League champion: 6  (with Crvena zvezda: 2014–15, 2015–16, 2016–17, 2018–19, 2020–21, 2021–22)
 Serbian Cup winner: 6  (with Crvena zvezda: 2012–13, 2013–14, 2014–15, 2016–17, 2020–21, 2021–22)
 Adriatic SuperCup winner: 1  (with Crvena zvezda: 2018)

References

External links 

 Profile at eurobasket.com
 

1979 births
Living people
Bosnia and Herzegovina expatriate basketball people in Serbia
Bosnia and Herzegovina men's basketball players
Bosnia and Herzegovina basketball coaches
KK Crvena zvezda assistant coaches
KK Leotar players
Serbian men's basketball coaches
Basketball players from Sarajevo
Serbs of Bosnia and Herzegovina
University of Belgrade Faculty of Sport and Physical Education alumni
Yugoslav Wars refugees